The Tazewell Depot is a historic railroad station at 135 Railroad Avenue in Tazewell, Virginia.  It is a long rectangular brick structure, one story in height, with a hip roof that has broad eaves supported by large brackets.  Both the long street-facing and track-facing sides have projecting bay sections.  The depot was built in 1928 by the Norfolk and Western Railway to serve passenger traffic on its line; the substantial freight volume was handled by a larger adjacent frame building.  Passenger service ended about 1957, after which time the depot was also used for freight traffic, which was finally ended in 1974.  It is one of two surviving depots that served on the Clinch River Line.

The depot was listed on the National Register of Historic Places in 2015.

See also
National Register of Historic Places listings in Tazewell County, Virginia

References

Stations along Southern Railway lines in the United States
Railway stations on the National Register of Historic Places in Virginia
Railway stations in the United States opened in 1928
Buildings and structures in Pittsylvania County, Virginia
National Register of Historic Places in Tazewell County, Virginia